Bani al-Abas is a sub-district located in Thula District, 'Amran Governorate, Yemen. Bani al-Abas had a population of 6106 according to the 2004 census.

References 

Sub-districts in Thula District